A human wave attack, also known as a human sea attack, is an offensive infantry tactic in which an attacker conducts an unprotected frontal assault with densely concentrated infantry formations against the enemy line, intended to overrun and overwhelm the defenders by engaging in melee combat. The name refers to the concept of a coordinated mass of soldiers falling upon an enemy force and sweeping them away with sheer weight and momentum, like an ocean wave breaking on a beach.

Definition
According to U.S. Army analyst Edward C. O'Dowd, the technical definition of a human wave attack tactic is a frontal assault by densely concentrated infantry formations against an enemy line, without any attempts to shield or to mask the attacker's movement. The goal of a human wave attack is to maneuver as many people as possible into close range, hoping that the shock from a large mass of attackers engaged in melee combat would force the enemy to disintegrate or fall back.

The human wave attack's reliance on melee combat usually makes the organization and the training of the attacking force irrelevant, but it requires either great physical courage, coercion, or morale for the attackers to advance into enemy fire. However, when matched against modern weaponry such as automatic firearms, artillery and aircraft, a human wave attack is an extremely dangerous and costly tactic in the face of devastating firepower. Thus, for a human wave attack to succeed on the modern battlefield, it is imperative for the attackers to charge into the enemy line in the shortest time and in the greatest numbers possible, so that a sufficient mass can be preserved when the attackers reach melee range.

However, this solution usually means that the attackers must sacrifice concealment and cover for numbers and speed. Because of this trade-off, human wave attacks can be used by an attacker with a lack of tactical training or one who lacks firepower and the ability to manoeuvre, but who can motivate and control their personnel.

Use
Human wave attacks have been used by several armed forces around the world, including European and American armies during the American Civil War and World War I, the Red Army during World War 2, the Chinese People's Liberation Army during the Korean War and Sino-Vietnamese War, Vietnamese forces during the Indochina Wars, and the Iranian Basij during the Iran–Iraq War.

Boxer Rebellion
Human wave attacks were used during the Boxer Rebellion in China. Boxer rebels performed human wave attacks against Eight-Nation Alliance forces during the Seymour Expedition and the Battle of Langfang where the Eight Nation Alliance was defeated and forced to retreat.

On June 11 and June 14, Boxers armed only with bladed melee weapons directly charged the Alliance troops at Langfang armed with rifles and machine guns in human wave attacks and the Boxers also blocked the retreat of the expedition via train by destroying the Tianjin-Langfang railway.

The Boxers and Dong Fuxiang's army worked together in the joint ambush with the Boxers relentlessly assaulting the Allies head on with human wave attacks displaying "no fear of death" and engaging the Allies in melee combat and putting the Allied troops under severe mental stress by mimicking vigorous gunfire with firecrackers. The Allies however suffered most of their losses at the hands of General Dong's troops, who used their expertise and persistence to engage in "bold and persistent" assaults on the Alliance forces, as remembered by the German Captain Usedom: the right wing of the Germans was almost at the point of collapse under the attack until they were rescued from Langfang by French and British troops; the Allies then retreated from Langfang in trains full of bullet holes.

Russo-Japanese War
During the Siege of Port Arthur, human wave attacks were conducted on Russian artillery and machine guns by the Japanese which ended up becoming suicidal. Since the Japanese suffered massive casualties in the attacks, one description of the aftermath was that "a thick, unbroken mass of corpses covered the cold earth like a coverlet."

Spanish Republicans
Human wave attacks have also been deployed by the Republicans in Spain during the Spanish Civil War most notably their defense of Casa de Campo during the Siege of Madrid, particularly the counterattack by the Durruti Column led by Buenaventura Durruti himself.
Also, as recounted by various former members of the Lincoln Battalion, it was not uncommon for Republican commanders to order units onto attacks that were warned by field officers to be ill-advised or suicidal.

Soviet Red Army
There were elements of human waves being utilized in the Russian Civil War recounted by American soldiers in Russia supporting the White Army.

In the Winter War of 1939–1940 the Soviet Red Army used human wave charges repeatedly against fortified Finnish positions, allowing the enemy machine gunners to mow them down, a tactic described as "incomprehensible fatalism" by the Finnish commander Mannerheim. This led to massive losses on the Soviet side and contributed to why the clearly weaker Finnish forces (both in manpower and armament) were able to resist the Soviet attacks.

The Soviets learned from their setbacks against Finland and tried using better tactics during the rest of the World War II.  However, human wave attacks were still utilized in full force against the Wehrmacht of Nazi Germany, most notably in the Battle of Stalingrad and the Battle of the Seelow Heights.

Imperial Japanese Army
The Imperial Japanese Army was known for its use of human wave attacks. There were even specialized units who were trained in this type of assault.

The charge was used successfully in the Russo-Japanese War and the Second Sino-Japanese War, where the highly disciplined Japanese soldiers were fighting against enemies with comparatively lower discipline and without many automatic weapons such as machine guns, oftentimes outnumbering them as well. In such instances, a determined charge could break into the enemy lines and win the day. The effectiveness of such strategies in China made them a standard tactic for the Imperial Japanese Army. However, these tactics became mostly known, at least to Western audiences, during the Pacific War, where Japanese forces used this approach against Allied forces. However, Allied forces drastically outnumbered the Japanese, and they were equipped with a very high number of automatic weapons. They also consisted of well-trained forces who would quickly adapt to Japanese charges. If the Allied forces could establish a defensive perimeter, their superior firepower would often result in crippling Japanese casualties and a failure of the attack. The Japanese battle-cry "Banzai" led to this form of charge being called the "Banzai charge" by the Allied forces.

In addition to its strategic use by Japanese military forces, the frequency of its use has been explained, in part, as Japanese troops adhering to their traditional Bushido honor code that viewed surrender as shameful or unacceptable, whereas the bravery of a human wave charge, even if suicidal, was an honorable choice. These banzai charges by Japanese soldiers against Allied troops equipped with machine guns, light mortars, semi-automatic rifles and sub-machine guns were often ineffective in altering the outcome of a battle, but American troops later reported severe psychological pressure from defending against these out-gunned human waves.

People's Liberation Army
During the Korean War, the term "human wave attack" was used to describe the Chinese short attack, a combination of infiltration and shock tactics employed by the People's Volunteer Army (PVA). According to some accounts, Marshal Peng Dehuai—the overall commander of the PVA forces in Korea—is said to have invented this tactic.

A typical Chinese short attack was carried out at night by numerous fireteams on a narrow front against the weakest point in enemy defenses. The PVA assault team would crawl undetected within grenade range, then launch surprise attacks against the defenders in order to breach the defenses by relying on maximum shock and confusion. If the initial shock failed to breach the defenses, additional fireteams would press on behind them and attack the same point until a breach was created. Once penetration was achieved, the bulk of the Chinese forces would move into the enemy rear and attack from behind. During the attacks, the Chinese assault teams would disperse while masking themselves using the terrain, and this made it difficult for UN defenders to target numerous Chinese troops. Attacks by the successive Chinese fireteams were also carefully timed to minimize casualties. Due to primitive communication systems and tight political controls within the Chinese army, short attacks were often repeated indefinitely until either the defenses were penetrated or the attacker's ammunition supply were exhausted, regardless of the chances of success or the human cost.

This persistent attack pattern left a strong impression on UN forces that fought in Korea, giving birth to the description of "human wave." U.S. Army historian Roy Edgar Appleman observed that the term "human wave" was later used by journalists and military officials to convey the image that the American soldiers were assaulted by overwhelming numbers of Chinese on a broad front. S.L.A. Marshall also commented that the word "mass" was indiscriminately used by the media to describe Chinese infantry tactics, and it is rare for the Chinese to actually use densely concentrated infantry formations to absorb enemy firepower. In response to the media's stereotype of Chinese assault troops deployed in vast "human seas", a joke circulated among the US servicemen was "How many hordes are there in a Chinese platoon?"

In Chinese sources, this tactic is referred to as "three-three fireteams," after the composition of the attack: three men would form one fireteam, and three fireteams one squad. A Chinese platoon, consisting of 50 men, would form three ranks of such fireteams, which would be employed to attack "one point" from "two sides."

Although abandoned by the PLA by 1953, the Chinese army re-adopted this tactic during the Sino-Vietnamese War due to the stagnation of the Chinese military modernization programs during the Cultural Revolution. Their use in the Sino-Vietnamese War is a rare example of an army with superior firepower, in this case the PLA, throwing away its advantage.

Iran–Iraq War

During the Iran–Iraq War, some of the attacks conducted by Iranian forces in large operations, were considered to be human wave attacks.

Eritrean-Ethiopian War 
In the Eritrean–Ethiopian War of 1998-2000, the widespread use of trenches has resulted in comparisons of the conflict to the trench warfare of World War I. According to some reports, trench warfare led to the loss of "thousands of young lives in human-wave assaults on Eritrea's positions".

See also 
 Attrition warfare
 Cannon fodder
 Swarming (military)
 Creeping barrage
 M18 Claymore – land mine designed in 1952 as a response to human wave attacks in Korea

Notes

References

External links 

 Footage of human wave attacks during the Korean war
 Documentary clip highlighting Iran's Human Wave Attacks vs. Iraq 1982

Assault tactics
Infantry
Land warfare
Tactical formations